Opencor (branded as OpenCor) is a chain of convenience stores owned and operated by the Spanish department store group El Corte Inglés. Opencor offers products found at most convenience chain stores such as snacks, drinks, quick bites, newspapers and magazines, as well as other items not normally found in convenience store chains such as music CDs, movies and video games.

The first Opencor store opened on May 18, 2000, in the Madrid suburb of Majadahonda. Some Opencor stores are open 24/7, although the majority of said stores open at 7am or 8am and close at 1am or 2am respectively. Opencor has the distinction of being one of only a few supermarket chains in Spain to operate on Sundays. Opencor also operate stores at Repsol petrol stations under the name Repsol-Opencor.

External links 
  

Retail companies of Spain
Retail companies established in 2000
Spanish brands